Spindle and kinetochore-associated protein 2 is a protein that in humans is encoded by the SKA2 gene found in chromosome 17. SKA2 is a part of a spindle and kinetochore associated complex also including SKA1 and SKA3 which is responsible for onset of the anaphase in mitosis by regulating chromosomal segregation.
  
SKA2 may function as a prognostic gene marker for identifying lung cancer as well as a proposed biomarker for suicidal tendencies and post-traumatic stress disorders. The SKA2 gene contains one single-nucleotide polymorphism (SNP) rs7208505 located in the 3' UTR. This genetic variant containing a cytosine (existing in the less common allele) instead of thymine along with epigenetic modification (such as DNA methylation) is correlated with suicidal tendencies and post-traumatic stress.

Discovery 
SKA2 protein was first documented as a product of as hypothetical gene FAM33A part of a Spindle and Kinetochore (KT)- associated complex necessary for timely anaphase onset. SKA2 was identified as the partner of SKA1, hence the name in 2006. Later on the 3rd component of the SKA complex was mass spectrometrically identified as C13Orf3 later referred to as SKA3. This complex plays an important role in the cell during mitotic transition from the metaphase to the anaphase.

Protein structure and sub-cellular localization 
SKA2 gene product is a 121 amino acid long chain and a molecular weight of 14,188 Da containing mainly 3 helices. Homologues of SKA2 protein being very small are found in several vertebrates but absent in invertebrates.
This protein mainly localizes in the condensed chromosome and to the outer spindle and kinetochore microtubules during mitosis. The SKA2 proteins localizes to the mitotic spindle and kinetochore associated proteins such as SKA1 and SKA3.

Function 
The SKA2 is a part of the larger spindle and kinetochore complex which is a sub-complex of the outer kinetochore and binds to the microtubules. This complex is essential for the correctly timed onset of anaphase during mitosis by helping in the chromosomal segregation and aids in the movement of microspheres along a microtubule in a depolymerisation-coupled manner, since it is a direct component in the kinetochore-microtubule interface along with directly associating with the microtubules as assemblies.

A reduced expression of SKA2 results in the loss of the complex from the kinetochore, however this loss of SKA-complex does not affect the overall structure of the Kinetochore yet the fibres show increased cold-sensitivity due to the loss. The cell goes through a prolonged delay in a metaphase-like state. It has been concluded that SKA2 regulates the maintenance of the metaphase plate and silencing of the spindle checkpoint leading to the onset of anaphase during mitosis. SKA2 also interacts with the glucocorticoid receptor aiding in the chaperoning of the receptor in the nucleus.

Clinical significance

Suicidal tendencies and post-traumatic stress disorder
The DNA methylation of SKA2 gene and the Single-nucleotide polymorphism rs7208505 genotype may have effects on suicidal behaviour according to linear model suggested by a study in 2014. The genotype rs7208505 contains a single nucleotide polymorphism (SNP) containing a Cytosine variant allele instead of Thymine present in the common allele. This SNP allows the dinucleotide repeat (CpG) elements to occur providing a gene segment for methylation. Thus DNA methylation alone may be the primary factor conferring risk of suicidal behaviour.  A study of allele of rs7208505 in different ethnic groups along with numerous psychiatric diagnosis suggested that the variation in SKA2 may mediate risk for suicidal behaviours that progress to attempt to suicide.

Lung cancer
The SKA2 gene along with PRR11 gene as a pair is essential for the development of lung cancer. The pair of genes are separated by a 548 bp intergenic region, and having a classical head-to-head gene pair motif share a prototypical bidirectional promoter containing a common CCAAT element. This promoter is regulated by NF-Y is a sequence specific transcription factor and has long been considered an activator of genes since it contains particular properties suitable to regulate bidirectional promotor with the CCAAT box sequence. This bidirectional promoters couple expression of 2 genes (protein coding) involved in the same biochemical process to allow a synchronized temporal or environmental control. 
The 2 genes SKA2 and PRR11 are vital for accelerated growth and motility of lung cancer cells and have prognostic value for patients. Along with SKA2, PRR11 also plays a major role in regulating cell cycle progression but from the late S phase to mitosis. Thus, having vital roles to play in cell cycle progression at different stages, SKA2 and PRR11 may co-ordinately regulate lung cancer proliferation by deregulation of cell cycle progression.
Since the transcription of SKA2 gene produces the protein coding mRNA SKA2 along with 2 other introns miRNA301a and miRNAA454, hence the function of the gene is not limited to production of a protein. These introns participate in tumorigenesis since miRNA301a regulates PTEN, NKRF, SMAD4 and PIAS3 and miRNAA454 targets SMAD4 playing an oncogenic role in human colon cancer.

Interactions 

SKA1
SKA3
GR (Glucocorticoid receptor)

References 

Biomarkers